Rudolf Hommes Rodríguez (born 6 December 1943) is a Colombian economist and politician, who served as Minister of Finance and Public Credit under the administration of President César Gaviria, introducing various liberal policies in Colombia's Economy. He is also a regular columnist on various Colombian media outlets, focusing mostly in finances.

Hommes attended California State University, Sacramento, where he received a BBA, a BSc, and a MBA; he also received a PhD in Management from the University of Massachusetts Amherst, and has been a professor of finance, statistics, economics, and decision theory at the University of the Andes.

References

1944 births
Living people
People from Bogotá
Isenberg School of Management alumni
Colombian economists
Ministers of Finance and Public Credit of Colombia
Academic staff of the University of Los Andes (Colombia)